Brate is a Swedish surname. People with this surname include:
Erik Brate (1854–1924), Swedish linguist.
Fanny Brate (1862–1940), Swedish painter
Cameron Brate (born 1991), American football tightened for the Tampa Buccaneers

Swedish-language surnames